Agonopterix communis is a moth in the family Depressariidae. It was described by Edward Meyrick in 1920. It is found in South Africa.

The wingspan is 14–15 mm. The forewings are light fuscous, with a pinkish tinge and a black dot towards the costa near the base. The discal stigmata is small and blackish and there is an additional dot before and above the first, as well as a few scattered blackish scales towards the costa between them. A second stigma is sometimes edged anteriorly by a faint whitish dot. There is a marginal series of blackish dots around the posterior part of the costa and termen. The hindwings are grey, but lighter towards the base.

References

Endemic moths of South Africa
Moths described in 1920
Agonopterix
Moths of Africa